Guan Weiyan (August 18, 1928 – March 20, 2003) was a Chinese physicist. He was a member of the Chinese Academy of Sciences.

References 

1928 births
2003 deaths
Members of the Chinese Academy of Sciences